The Bristol Development Corporation was established in 1989 to develop parts of eastern Bristol, England. Its flagship developments included the Bristol Spine Road. During its lifetime 1.3m sq.ft. of non-housing development and 676 housing units were built. Around 4,825 jobs were created and some £235m of private finance was leveraged in.

The Chairman was Christopher Thomas and the Chief Executive was Miles Collinge. It was dissolved in 1995.

References

History of Bristol
British companies established in 1989
Companies disestablished in 1995
Defunct companies based in Bristol
Defunct public bodies of the United Kingdom
Development Corporations of the United Kingdom
Economy of Bristol